Fabio Garriba (13 November 1944 – 9 August 2016) was an Italian  stage, film and television actor.

Life and career 
Born in Soave, Garriba started his career on stage, and in 1969 he made his film debut in Dziga Vertov Group's Wind from the East. He later worked with prominent directors such as Roberto Rossellini, Bernardo Bertolucci, Ettore Scola, Marco Bellocchio and Luigi Magni. He also had leading roles in films directed by his twin brother Mario, notably the Golden Leopard winner On the Point of Death. 

Garriba also worked as assistant director for Bernardo Bertolucci, Pier Paolo Pasolini, Marco Ferreri and Carmelo Bene. His only work as director, the short film I parenti tutti, was screened at the 68th Venice International Film Festival alongside his brother's works in the retrospective "Orizzonti 1960-1978".  Garriba also published several collections of poetries.

Filmography

References

External links  

 
 

1944 births  
2016 deaths 
People from the Province of Verona
Italian male stage actors
Italian male film actors
Italian male television actors
20th-century Italian male actors